Ian P. Thompson (born 8 June 1958) is an English former professional footballer who played as a forward in the Football League. He scored for AFC Bournemouth in their 2-0 giantkilling win over Manchester United in the FA Cup in January 1984. He also played as Bournemouth won the inaugural Associate Members' Cup by beating Hull City in the final.

References

Sources
Profile at Neil Brown

1958 births
Living people
Sportspeople from Dartford
English footballers
Association football forwards
Poole Town F.C. players
Salisbury City F.C. players
AFC Bournemouth players
Merthyr Tydfil F.C. players
Haverfordwest County A.F.C. players
English Football League players
Inter Cardiff F.C. players